Nouzha Skalli (born May 25, 1950 in El Jadida, Morocco) is a Moroccan politician from the Party of Progress and Socialism who served as Minister of Solidarity, Women, Family, and Social Development from October 2007 until January 2012 in the government of Abbas El Fassi.

Skalli received her degree in pharmacy from the University of Montpellier.

Political career
 In 2002, she was elected MP at the house of Representatives for the PPS
 In 2003-2004, she became chairwoman of the Socialist Alliance parliamentary group
 Vice chairwoman of the commission for social sectors at the House of representatives
 Member of the political bureau of the PPS
 Founding member and one of the national representatives of the democratic association of women of Morocco (ADFM), created in 1985
 Founding member and animator of the CLEF (Center for Feminine Leadership), created in 1997 in Casablanca
 Founding member of the Moroccan organisation of human rights (OMDH)
 Founding member of the Center for legal advice and support to assaulted women, created in 1995 in Casablanca
 Member of the administrative board of the National institution for solidarity to battered women (INSAF)
 Founder of the National committee for the political participation of women in 1992, Casablanca
 Former chairwoman of the national union of pharmaceutical workers unions of Morocco (1993–1997)
 Member of the Global Network for Local Governance's steering committee (GNLG), based in New Delhi

Awards
 By Espode: Feminine talents (March 2005)
 By Washington's Population Institute: Best leader award, December 2004
 By the Democratic association of Women of Morocco on Casablanca, 2002
 By the Parpaceutical union in 2001
 In November 2009 the Club de la Donne (wives club) awarded her the "Minerva" Anna Mammolitti prize, politics section

Publications
Nouzha Skalli wrote several articles and interviews in national and foreign newspapers:
 Al Bayane 
 The Economist
 The New Tribune
 Al Adath Al Maghribia
 Women of Morocco
 Citadine
 Wall street Journal
 Le Monde
 Le Point

ADFM publications
 Women's Rights in Morocco: The Universal and Specific (1992);
 Women and Power in Morocco: Mutilated Democracy (2001);
 Participative Budget (2003)

References

Further reading

External links
 Social.gov.ma

Living people
Skalli Nouzha
Government ministers of Morocco
1950 births
Party of Progress and Socialism politicians